Cherryville is a census-designated place in Lehigh Township in Northampton County, Pennsylvania. Its population was 1,618 as of the 2020 U.S. census.

It is situated along Pennsylvania Route 248, between the villages of Indianland and Pennsville. The ZIP Code is 18035. 

It is part of the Lehigh Valley metropolitan area, which had a population of 861,899 and was the 68th most populous metropolitan area in the U.S. as of the 2020 census.

History

The village was founded around 1804, making it one of the township's earliest settlements. The name Cherryville is believed to have been taken from a road called Cherry Row Lane which was bordered by 100 cherry trees. A post office was established here in 1816. By the 1870s, the village included 25 houses, two carriage shops, two blacksmith shops, a wheel shop,  a tailor, and four stores.

Notable people
Samuel Henry Kress, founder of S. H. Kress & Co. and art collector

Notes

Census-designated places in Northampton County, Pennsylvania
Census-designated places in Pennsylvania